Sindh Agriculture University, (Sindhi:  سنڌ زرعي يونيورسٽي ٽنڊو ڄام )  is situated in Tando Jam town of  Hyderabad, on Hyderabad-Mirpurkhas highway and is about  from Karachi airport linked with super highway to Hyderabad.

Recognized university 
Sindh Agriculture University is ranked 3rd best university in Agriculture in Pakistan by the Higher Education Commission.

The university is an academic complex of five faculties (Faculty of Crop Production, Faculty of Crop Protection, Faculty of Agricultural Social Sciences, Faculty of Agricultural Engineering and Faculty of Animal Husbandry and Veterinary Sciences).  Two institutes (Information Technology Centre and Institute of Food Sciences and Technology ). Three affiliated colleges (Sub Campus Umarkot, Shaheed Z.A.Bhutto Agriculture College Dokri and The Khairpur College of Agricultural Engineering and Technology)  and Directorate of Advanced Studies and Research. The five faculties are majoring in almost 41 departments. These include the Doctor of Veterinary Medicine (D.V.M), Bachelor of Engineering in Agriculture (B.E.Agriculture), Bachelor of Science (Agriculture Honours) . and Bachelor of Science Information Technology (BS-IT Honours). The university offers postgraduate programmes leading to the award of M.S/ME and MS-IT  in Animal Husbandry and Veterinary Sciences, Agricultural Engineering and Information Technology and in all the above-mentioned disciplines of Agriculture. M.Phil and Ph.D degree programmes are also offered in selected subject areas where trained staff and other facilities are available.

Geography
The total area covered by the university is  including an area of more than 80 acres occupied by residential and non-residential buildings of the University, Agricultural Research Institute, Nuclear Institute of Agriculture, Rural Academy, Agricultural Engineering Workshop, Drainage Research Centre, and Central Veterinary Diagnostic Laboratory.

Faculties
A modest number of short courses and training programmes are regularly offered to meet the continuing and in service education needs of Agriculture Officers, Field Assistants, Bank Officials, Agricultural Technicians, Progressive Farmers, Small Farmers, Tenants, Gardeners, Housewives and other clientele groups.

Faculty of Crop Production
 Department of Soil Science.
 Department of Agronomy.
 Department of Horticulture.
 Department of Plant Breeding & Genetics.
 Department of Biotechnology.
 Department of Crop Physiology.

Faculty of Crop Protection

 Department of Entomology.
 Department of Plant Pathology.
 Department of Plant Protection.

Faculty of Agriculture Social Sciences

 Department of Agriculture Economics.
 Department of Agriculture Extensions. 
 Department of Rural Sociology.
 Department of Statistics.
 Department of English.
 Department of Islamic Studies.
 Department of Studies.

Faculty of Agriculture Engineering

 Department of Irrigation and Drainage.
 Department of Farm Power and Machinery. 
 Department of Land and Water Management
 Department of Farm Structure.
 Department of Energy and Environment.
 Department of Basic Engineering.

Faculty of Animal Husbandry and Veterinary Sciences (AVHS)

 Department of Animal and Histology.
 Department of Animal Nutrition. 
 Department of Animal Breeding and Genetics.
 Department of Animal Products. 
 Department of Animal Reproduction..
 Department of Veterinary Parasitology.
 Department of Veterinary Pathology.
 Department of Veterinary Pharmacology.
 Department of Veterinary Medicines.
 Department of Livestock.
 Department of Poultry and Husbandry
 Department of Surgery and Obstetrics.

Information Technology Centre

 Computerisation and Network (MS-IT)
 Software Engineering and Information System(MS-IT)

Institute of Food Sciences and Technology

References

External links
 Sindh Agriculture University Tandojam

Public universities and colleges in Sindh
Universities and colleges in Hyderabad District, Pakistan
Agricultural universities and colleges in Pakistan
Agriculture in Sindh